Pizzo del Ramulazz is a 2,939 metres high mountain in the Lepontine Alps, located on the border between the cantons of Ticino and Graubünden. The east side of the mountain, overlooking the Calanca valley, consists of a large and steep face.

A secondary summit (2,915 metres) on the north side overlooks Passo del Ramulazz.

References

Lepontine Alps
Mountains of the Alps
Mountains of Switzerland
Mountains of Ticino
Mountains of Graubünden
Graubünden–Ticino border
Calanca